Phyllidiella molaensis is a species of sea slug, a dorid nudibranch, a shell-less marine gastropod mollusk in the family Phyllidiidae.

Distribution 
This species was described from the Caribbean Sea coast of Panama. It has been reported from Costa Rica.

Description
This nudibranch is white with a pattern of black concentric rings. The rhinophores are black with white tips.

Diet
This species feeds on sponges.

References

Phyllidiidae
Gastropods described in 1977